Two Kinds of Women is a 1932 American pre-Code drama film directed by William C. deMille, written by Benjamin Glazer, adapted from the play by Robert E. Sherwood, and starring Miriam Hopkins, Phillips Holmes, Irving Pichel, Wynne Gibson, Stanley Fields and Vivienne Osborne. It was released on January 16, 1932, by Paramount Pictures.

Cast
Miriam Hopkins as Emma Krull
Phillips Holmes as Joseph Gresham Jr.
Irving Pichel as Senator Krull
Wynne Gibson as Phyllis Adrian
Stanley Fields as Harry Glassman
Vivienne Osborne as Helen
Stuart Erwin as Hauser
Josephine Dunn as Clarissa Smith
Robert Emmett O'Connor as Tim

References

External links
 

1932 films
American drama films
1932 drama films
Paramount Pictures films
Films directed by William C. deMille
American black-and-white films
1930s English-language films
1930s American films